Eupithecia nigristriata is a moth in the family Geometridae. It is found in western China (Tibet, Qinghai).

The wingspan is about 17–18 mm. The fore- and hindwings are uniform pale brown.

References

Moths described in 2004
nigristriata
Moths of Asia